Mohsin Fadzli Samsuri (30 November 1945 – 10 March 2022) was the Member of the Parliament of Malaysia for the Bagan Serai constituency in Perak from 2008 to 2013.

Mohsin was elected to Parliament in the 2008 election, winning the seat of Bagan Serai from UMNO deputy Minister Zainal Abidin Zin. He was elected on the ticket of the People's Justice Party (PKR) but quit the party in March 2010 to sit as an independent, saying he felt "betrayed and sabotaged". His resignation from PKR followed the resignations of fellow PKR members of parliament Zahrain Mohamed Hashim and Tan Tee Beng. He did not contest the 2013 election.

Election results

Death
Mohsin Fadzli died on 10 March 2022.

References

1945 births
2022 deaths
People from Perak
Malaysian people of Malay descent
Malaysian Muslims
Independent politicians in Malaysia
Former People's Justice Party (Malaysia) politicians
Members of the Dewan Rakyat